Powersville is an unincorporated community in Peach County, in the U.S. state of Georgia.

History
Powersville had its start when the Macon and Southwestern Railroad was extended to that point. The community was named after a railroad official. A variant name is "Powerville". A post office called Powersville was established in 1853, and remained in operation until 1985.

References

Unincorporated communities in Peach County, Georgia